The 1987–88 Vanderbilt Commodores men's basketball men's basketball team represented Vanderbilt University as a member of the Southeastern Conference during the 1987–88 college basketball season. The team was led by head coach C. M. Newton and played its home games at Memorial Gymnasium.

The Commodores finished with a 20–11 record (10–8 SEC, T-4th) and received an at-large bid to the NCAA tournament. Vanderbilt made a run to the Sweet Sixteen before losing to the eventual National champion, Kansas.

Roster

Schedule and results

|-
!colspan=9 style=| Regular season

|-
!colspan=9 style=| SEC tournament

|-
!colspan=9 style=| NCAA tournament

Rankings

Awards and honors
Will Perdue – SEC Player of the Year, SEC Athlete of the Year, Third-team All-American

NBA draft

References

Vanderbilt Commodores men's basketball seasons
Vanderbilt
Vanderbilt Commodores men's basketball
Vanderbilt Commodores men's basketball
Vanderbilt